is a Japanese light novel series written by Nana Nanana and illustrated by Parum. It began publication in January 2021 under ASCII Media Works' Dengeki Bunko imprint. As of January 2023, six volumes have been released. A manga adaptation illustrated by Kamelie has been serialized in ASCII Media Works' shōnen manga magazine Dengeki Daioh since August 2021, with its chapters collected into two tankōbon volumes as of March 2023. An anime adaptation has been announced.

Media

Light novel

Manga
A manga adaptation illustrated by Kamelie began serialization in ASCII Media Works' Dengeki Daioh magazine on August 27, 2021. The first volume was released on May 9, 2022. It has been compiled in two tankōbon volumes as of March 10, 2023.

Anime
In August 2022, it was announced that the series would be receiving an anime adaptation.

Reception
As of August 2022, the series has over 200,000 copies in circulation.

References

External links
  
  
 

2021 Japanese novels
Anime and manga based on light novels
ASCII Media Works manga
Dengeki Bunko
Dengeki Daioh
Light novels
Romantic comedy anime and manga
School life in anime and manga
Shōnen manga